
The deerskin trade between Colonial America and the Native Americans was one of the most important trading relationships between Europeans and Native Americans, especially in the southeast. It was a form of the fur trade, but less known, since deer skins were not as valuable as furs from the north (such as beaver). Colonial deerskin exports were an important source of raw material for the European markets. The Cherokee mainly traded their deer-skins to the English, and the Shawnee traded deer skins to both the French and English colonies prior to 1760.

In the early 18th century, after King William's War, the beaver fur trade declined dramatically while the deerskin trade boomed. This was in part due to a shift in changing fashions in London, where a new kind of hat made from leather was becoming popular. This new hat required deerskin and colonial South Carolina increased the scale of its deerskin exports dramatically. Trade in other kinds of fur fell sharply. The end of a diversified fur trade altered the relationship between European colonists and Native Americans, in many cases caused an increase in tension and conflict. For example, it was an important factor in the events leading up to the Yamasee War.

By 1750, deer were becoming harder to find in Cherokee territory. So large was the scale of the trade that in time deer became nearly extinct in the southeast. It also radically altered the social make-up of the Cherokee because the men were increasingly absent from towns (for long periods to hunt deer). Concurrently, Cherokee society was undergoing a growing dependence on European trade goods. These events contributed to growing tensions and conflict between the Indian tribes themselves, as well as with the Europeans.

Deerskin was used to produce buckskin, as well as a chamois-like leather, used for the making of gloves, bookbinding, and many other things.

See also
 Deer hunting
 Leather currency
 Indian trade

Notes
 Drake, Richard B. (2003) A History of Appalachia University Press of Kentucky 
 Braund, Kathryn E. (1996) Deerskins and Duffels: Creek Indian Trade with Anglo-America, 1685-1815 University of Nebraska Press

References

External links
 English Trade in Deerskins and Indian Slaves , New Georgia Encyclopedia

Fur trade
18th century Cherokee history
History of the Thirteen Colonies
Pre-statehood history of South Carolina
Deer hunting